Héctor Hernán Pinto Lara (born 12 June 1951) is a Chilean former footballer and manager. In January 2017 he flew to China at the request of Chilean coach Manuel Pellegrini to be the manager of the reserve team of Hebei Fortune and will work closely with Pellegrini to promote players to the first division side, which Pellegrini currently manages.

Honours

Manager

Club

Universidad de Chile
 Torneo Apertura: 2004

References

1951 births
Chilean footballers
Chilean Primera División players
Universidad de Chile footballers
Colo-Colo footballers
Unión Española footballers
Chilean football managers
Chilean Primera División managers
Unión Española managers
Universidad de Chile managers
Deportes Iquique managers
Living people
Association football midfielders
Chile national under-20 football team managers